The first International Conference on Computer Communications was held October 24–26, 1972 in Washington, DC at the Hilton Washington. It was organized by BBN Technologies under the direction of Bob Kahn and was one of the first public demonstrations of computer networking technology and functionality as well as products of the ARPANET project.

IPTO Director Lawrence Roberts, who would serve as the conference's chair, decided that the ICCC would be the ideal place to showcase the capabilities of ARPANET.  With the help of MIT professor Al Vezza, Khan enlisted help from across the country of scientists and students working with ARPANET. A Terminal Interface Processor was installed at the Hilton, connected to ARPANET by a dedicated phone line installed by AT&T, and then connected to dozens of terminals set up on the floor. The conference began with a VIP reception on the 22nd before opening on the 24th. The ARPANET demo was a "mind-blowing" success, connecting attendees to systems across the nation and abroad to engage them in a variety of activities, including interacting with an air traffic control system and playing computer chess.  The success of the demo prompted an acceleration of the use and expansion of ARPANET, bringing the network closer to becoming the modern internet.

References

Further reading 

 Where Wizards Stay Up Late: The Origins of the Internet Katie Hafner (with Matthew Lyon) (Simon & Schuster, 1996)

External links
 RFC #371 - Demonstration at International Computer Communications Conference

Computer conferences